This is a list of villages in Massachusetts, arranged alphabetically.

In Massachusetts, villages usually do not have any official legal status; all villages are part of an incorporated municipality (town or city - see List of municipalities in Massachusetts) which is the smallest official form of government.  The terms "community", "district", "neighborhood", and "section" are often used to describe these non-municipal entities, which vary considerably in size and relative geographic isolation. Boundaries are sometimes ambiguous, though the United States Census uses the term census-designated place when it assigns boundaries to these entities (based on local usage) for the purpose of tabulating community demographics.  Many villages have neighborhood associations.

Active

Inactive
The following names are also currently or were formerly used to describe places in Massachusetts:

See also
List of municipalities in Massachusetts
:Category:Census-designated places in Massachusetts

References
Turners Falls  Montague  Franklin

External links
Archaic Community, District, Neighborhood Section and Village, Names in Massachusetts, Secretary of the Commonwealth of Massachusetts.

 
 
Villages
Massachusetts